Karine Lalieux (born 4 May 1964) is a Belgian politician of the Socialist Party (PS) who has been serving as Minister of Pensions, Social Integration, Fighting Poverty and Disabled Persons in the government of Prime Minister Alexander De Croo since 2020.

References 

Living people
1964 births
Place of birth missing (living people)
Women government ministers of Belgium
Socialist Party (Belgium) politicians
21st-century Belgian women politicians
21st-century Belgian politicians
Université libre de Bruxelles alumni
Government ministers of Belgium